The 1975 Near Islands earthquake occurred at 08:43 UTC on February 2 off the coast of Attu Island, Alaska. The earthquake had a surface wave magnitude of 7.6 and a maximum Mercalli intensity of IX (Violent). It caused heavy damage on Shemya Island, injuring 15 residents.

See also
List of earthquakes in 1975
List of earthquakes in Alaska
List of earthquakes in the United States

References

External links

Rat Islands
1975 in Alaska
Near